Martin Brauer (24 March 1971 – 26 February 2021) was a German actor and musician.

Biography
Brauer studied percussion at the Hochschule für Musik "Hanns Eisler" from 1987 to 1991 and then acting at the Ernst Busch Academy of Dramatic Arts from 1995 to 1999. He also acted with the Kulturinsel Halle and the Thalia Theater. He returned to the stage in 2016 as a member of the Mecklenburg State Theatre.

From 1999 to 2001, Brauer was a lecturer at the University of Music and Theatre Leipzig. In 2013, he became a lecturer at the Academy of Performing Arts Baden-Wuerttemberg. 

In addition to his theatre career, Brauer has appeared in numerous films and television series. He made appearances in episodes of SOKO Wismar, and In aller Freundschaft. He also has played drums for multiple bands, including .

On 27 February 2021, the Mecklenburg State Theater announced that Martin Brauer had died unexpectedly the previous night at the age of 49.

Filmography
 (2008)
Die Geschichte Mitteldeutschlands (2010)

References

1971 births
2021 deaths
20th-century German male actors
21st-century German male musicians
21st-century German male actors
20th-century German male musicians